Ahmad Ihwan (born March 27, 1993) is an Indonesian professional footballer who plays as a forward for Liga 2 club PSMS Medan.

Club career

Sriwijaya
He was signed for Sriwijaya to play in Liga 2 in the 2019 season, Ihwan scored 10 goals in 24 appearances.

Badak Lampung
He was signed for Badak Lampung to play in the Liga 2 in the 2020 season. This season was suspended on 27 March 2020 due to the COVID-19 pandemic. The season was abandoned and was declared void on 20 January 2021.

PSIM Yogyakarta
In 2021, Ahmad Ihwan signed a contract with Indonesian Liga 2 club PSIM Yogyakarta. He made his league debut on 26 September in a 1–0 loss against PSCS Cilacap at the Manahan Stadium, Surakarta.

PSMS Medan
Ihwan was signed for PSMS Medan to play in Liga 2 in the 2022–23 season. He made his league debut on 30 August 2022 in a match against PSKC Cimahi at the Si Jalak Harupat Stadium, Soreang.

References

External links
 Ahmad Ihwan at Soccerway
 Ahmad Ihwan at Liga Indonesia

1993 births
Association football forwards
Badak Lampung F.C.
Badak Lampung F.C. players
Sriwijaya F.C. players
Lampung Sakti players
Liga 2 (Indonesia) players
Persija Jakarta players
Living people
Indonesian footballers
Liga 1 (Indonesia) players
Sportspeople from Malang